The Ecodan is a domestic air source heat pump produced by Mitsubishi Electric. 

The Ecodan range comprises four models: 5 kW single phase, 8.5 kW single phase, 14 kW single phase and 14 kW three phase. The Ecodan utilises a refrigeration circuit with a compressor and condenser and uses inverter-driven - as opposed to fixed-speed - technology.

Specifications

Inverter-Driven Technology 

The Ecodan utilizes a heat pump compressor driven by an inverter. The compressors helps to convert free energy from the air and upgrades it to higher temperatures suitable for heating. The inverter control regulates the system to modulate the heat output according to the exact capacity required.

Starting current 

The Ecodan operates on a standard single phase power supply and has a starting current of 5 amps.

Noise levels 

The Ecodan has an operating noise level of 49dBA.

References

Heat pumps
Mitsubishi Electric products, services and standards